John Barton  (born 17 June 1948) is a British Anglican priest and biblical scholar. From 1991 to 2014, he was the Oriel and Laing Professor of the Interpretation of Holy Scripture at the University of Oxford and a Fellow of Oriel College. In addition to his academic career, he has been an ordained and serving priest in the Church of England since 1973.

His research interests and extensive publications have been in the areas of the Old Testament prophets, the biblical canon, biblical interpretation, and Old Testament theology. From 2010 to 2013, he researched Ethics in Ancient Israel, having been funded by a Leverhulme Major Research Fellowship. Barton is a foreign member of the Norwegian Academy of Science and Letters and has been a Fellow of the British Academy since 2007.

As of 2013, he continued to assist in services and other activities in the parish of Abingdon, in which he resides.

Early life and education
John Barton was born on 17 June 1948 in London, England. He was educated at Latymer Upper School, a private school in Hammersmith, London. He studied theology at Keble College, Oxford, graduating with a Bachelor of Arts (BA) degree in 1969: as per tradition, his BA was promoted to a Master of Arts (MA Oxon) degree in 1973.

He moved to Merton College, Oxford, to undertake postgraduate research, and completed his Doctor of Philosophy (DPhil) degree in 1974. His doctoral thesis was titled The Relation of God to Ethics in the Eighth Century Prophets. He was awarded a Doctor of Letters (DLitt) degree, a higher doctorate, by the University of Oxford in 1988.

Career

Academic career
Barton was a Junior Research Fellow at Merton College, Oxford, between 1973 and 1974. In 1974, he was elected a Fellow of St Cross College, Oxford, and made a university lecturer in theology (Old Testament) at the University of Oxford. He was promoted from lecturer to Reader in Biblical Studies in 1989. In 1991, he was made Oriel and Laing Professor of the Interpretation of Holy Scripture and therefore elected a Fellow of Oriel College, Oxford. From 2010 to 2013 he held a Leverhulme Major Research Fellowship for work on a project entitled Ethics in Ancient Israel. He stepped down as Oriel and Laing Professor in 2014, and was made an Emeritus Fellow of Oriel College. Since 2014, he has been a Senior Research Fellow of Campion Hall, Oxford, a Jesuit-run permanent private hall of the University of Oxford.

Additional roles
He has been a Delegate of Oxford University Press since 2005.  From 2004 to 2010 he was joint editor of the Journal of Theological Studies and is one of two Anglophone editors for the German monograph series Beihefte zur Zeitschrift für die alttestamentliche Wissenschaft, published in Berlin.

Ordained ministry
In 1973, Barton was ordained in the Church of England as a deacon and priest. Concentrating on his academic career, he did not hold an ecclesiastical position until 1979 when he was made chaplain of St Cross College, Oxford. He continued this ministry until he left St Cross College for Oriel College, Oxford in 1991. In addition to his professorial appointment, he served as Canon Theologian of Winchester Cathedral between 1991 and 2003. He assists in services and other activities in the parish of Abingdon, in which he resides.

From 2000 to 2005 and from 2009 to 2010 he served on the church's General Synod, representing the clergy of the University of Oxford. He sits on the Governing Body of Ripon College Cuddesdon, and was elected President of Modern Church in 2011. In 2013, Barton resigned from the office due to ill health, but he continues to serve on the editorial board of the periodical, Modern Church.

Research interests
Barton's research interests have included the Old Testament prophets, the biblical canon, biblical interpretation, Old Testament theology, as well as biblical ethics.

Honours
In 2007, Barton was elected a Fellow of the British Academy (FBA), the United Kingdom's national academy for the humanities and social sciences. He is also a Corresponding Fellow of the Norwegian Academy of Science and Letters.

In 1998, Barton was awarded an honorary Doctor of Theology (Dr. theol.) degree by the University of Bonn.

A History of the Bible: The Book and Its Faiths was shortlisted for the 2020 Wolfson History Prize and won the 2019 Duff Cooper Prize. It was adapted for radio and broadcast on BBC Radio 4 in December 2020.

Books

Sole authorship
 
 
 
 
 
 
 
 
  - American edition How the Bible came to be

Joint authorship

Edited
 
 
 
  - English version Revelation and Story: Narrative Theology and the Centrality of Story

Festschrift

Personal life
In 1973, Barton married Mary Burn. Together they have one daughter.

Barton lives in the parish of Abingdon.

References

Further reading
 

 

 
 
 

1948 births
Living people
Fellows of Oriel College, Oxford
Fellows of St Cross College, Oxford
Fellows of Campion Hall, Oxford
Oriel and Laing Professors of the Interpretation of Holy Scripture
Members of the Norwegian Academy of Science and Letters
Academic journal editors
British biblical scholars
Fellows of the British Academy
Old Testament scholars
Oxford University Press Delegate
20th-century English Anglican priests
Anglican biblical scholars
English Anglican theologians
Alumni of Keble College, Oxford
Alumni of Merton College, Oxford
20th-century Anglican theologians
21st-century Anglican theologians
Presidents of the Society for Old Testament Study